Javed Masood is a former cricketer who played first-class cricket for East Pakistan cricket teams in Pakistan from 1961 to 1968.

His highest score was 215 against Hyderabad in the Quaid-e-Azam Trophy in 1962–63, out of a team total of 376. The previous season he had made 41 and 104 against Hyderabad. East Pakistan won both matches.

References

External links
 
 

Year of birth missing (living people)
Living people
Place of birth missing (living people)
Pakistani cricketers
East Pakistan cricketers